Distocercospora livistonae is a fungus in the family Mycosphaerellaceae.

References 

Mycosphaerellaceae
Fungi described in 2006
Fungal plant pathogens and diseases